"Plutonian Ode" is a poem written by American Beat poet Allen Ginsberg in 1978 against the arms race and nuclear armament of the superpowers. It is heavily inspired by Gnosticism which Ginsberg came to know after reading Hans Jonas's book on the subject.

Philip Glass' Symphony No. 6 is based on and includes parts of this poem.

It was first published in The CoEvolution Quarterly / Journal for the Protection of All Beings co-issue, Fall 1978.

References

External links
Plutonian Ode
"Plutonian Ode" read by author

Poetry by Allen Ginsberg
1978 poems
Anti-war works
Nuclear war and weapons in popular culture